"Great Balls of Fire" is a 1957 song by Jerry Lee Lewis.
"The Great Ball of Fire" is an extended play by Lewis released the same year 
 Great Balls of Fire! (film), a 1989 American biographical film about Lewis
Great Balls of Fire may also refer to:
 Great Balls of Fire (Mae West album), 1972
 Great Balls of Fire (Dolly Parton album), 1979
 WWE Great Balls of Fire, a professional wrestling event produced by WWE, 2017

See also
 1972 Great Daylight Fireball (10 August 1972) meteor
 Ball of Fire (disambiguation)
 Fireball (disambiguation)